The Noye is a river in northern France.

Noye may also refer to: 
 Kenneth Noye (born 1947), British criminal
 Fred C. Noye (born 1946), politician in Pennsylvania, USA
 Noah in Noye's Fludde, Benjamin Britten's opera about the Bible's Noah, ark and flood

See also
 Noyes (disambiguation)